Malte Brun is the highest peak in the Malte Brun Range, which lies between the Tasman and Murchison Glaciers within New Zealand's Southern Alps. A list published by the New Zealand Alpine Club ranks Malte Brun as the third highest mountain in New Zealand.

It was named by Julius von Haast after the French geographer Victor Adolphe Malte-Brun.

Climbing
Malte Brun was first ascended by Tom Fyfe (solo climb) in March 1894 via the North Face. Today, many climbing routes lie on the mountain, all of which require technical experience and equipment. The classic route is the West Ridge which includes the "Cheval", a knife edge ridge traversed by straddling. Some of the major climbing routes on Malte Brun include:
 – West Ridge (NZ Alpine grade 3+)
 – South Ridge (NZ Alpine Grade 3)
 – South Face (NZ Alpine Grades 4 – 4+)

Two huts servicing climbers used to exist on the lower slopes, The Beetham hut in the Beetham Valley, and the Malte Brun Hut on moraine terraces above the Tasman Glacier. The Beetham hut was destroyed by Avalanche in the early 1990s.

See also
 List of mountains of New Zealand by height

References

Malte-Brun, Mount
Southern Alps